Devendra Kumar Tiwari (born 26 March 1960) is a 1986 batch Indian Administrative Service (IAS) officer of Jharkhand cadre, and is currently the State Election Commissioner of Jharkhand. He was the 22nd Chief Secretary of Jharkhand, leaving that office on March 31, 2020.

Education 
Tiwari is an MBBS graduate of King George's Medical University. He also holds a Bachelor of Laws degree from Chotanagpur Law College and a Master of Arts in Economics from the University of Manchester.

Career 
Tiwari has served in several positions for the Government of Bihar and the Government of Jharkhand, such as District Magistrate and Collector of Kishanganj and Chhapra districts in Bihar, Secretary (Building Construction), Secretary (Water Resources), Secretary (Health), Principal Secretary to the Chief Minister, Principal Secretary (Human Resources), Principal Secretary (Planning), and Principal Resident Commissioner (Jharkhand Bhavan, New Delhi) for the Jharkhand government.

He was appointed as the Development Commissioner of Jharkhand in June 2018, and as the Chief Secretary of Jharkhand in April 2019.

References 

Living people

Alumni of the University of Manchester

1960 births
King George's Medical University alumni
Indian Administrative Service officers
People from Uttar Pradesh